The Weight of an Empty Room is the first full album produced by the American indie rock band Vedera (formerly Veda).

Track listing
 "Trade This Fear" – 3:55
 "Song for a Friend" – 3:36
 "The Falling Kind" – 3:36
 "Lover's Lie" – 3:20
 "Desire on Repeat" – 3:54
 "In the Quiet" – 3:37
 "It's All Happening on Broadway" – 3:36
 "Still Standing" – 3:44
 "Redemption Soon" – 4:41
 "Moments Rewound" – 3:56
 "Safe" – 4:05
 "Song Four, Side Two" – 4:05
 "Lover's Lie (acoustic)" – 3:42

References

2005 debut albums
Albums produced by Ed Rose
Vedera albums